George Tawia Odamtten,  (born 7 July 1948) is a Ghanaian mycologist and academic at the University of Ghana. 
He is the editor-in-chief of the Ghana Journal of Science. He is a Fellow of the Ghana Academy of Arts and Sciences.

Early life and education
George Odamtten was born on 7 July 1948 in Koforidua to Theophilus Ayitey Odamtten and Comfort Dewi Quarcoo.

He had his early education at the Suhum Presbyterian School and the Salem School, Osu. Odamtten attended the Accra Academy for his secondary education from 1962 to 1969. Odamtten studied at the University of Ghana between 1970 and 1977 for a bachelor's degree and master's degree in botany. He was employed as a research scientific officer at GAEC in 1978. From 1979 to 1981, he was awarded an IAEA Fellowship tenable at IFFIT in Wageningen, the Netherlands.  
  
Odamtten took up part-time lectureship at University of Ghana in 1981 and subsequently full-time appointment as lecturer in 1983 in the Department of Botany. He was awarded his doctorate degree in 1986 at the Wageningen University.

Career
Odamtten served as head of the Department of Botany at the University of Ghana on two occasions from 1988 to 1992 and from 1997 to 2001, and oversaw its transformation to become the Department of Plant and Environmental Biology.
 
In 1996, Odamtten became acting dean of the School of Graduate Studies, University of Ghana and held this post until 1998. He became chairman of the university's Volta Basin Research Project carried out from 1998 to 2004. In 2003, Odamtten was appointed dean of the Faculty of Science of the University of Ghana for a three year tenure. 

In 1992, he served as a member of the International Mycological Association Committee for the Development of Mycology in Africa (CODMA).That same year he was made a founding vice president of the African Mycological Association. 

Odamtten was a visiting professor to the University of Bremen in Germany and Wageningen University and Research Centre in the Netherlands. Odamtten is a reviewer of many international Journals and is currently the editor-in-chief of the Ghana Journal of Science.

Odamtten was amongst a group academic experts who were tasked on the establishment of the University of the Gambia in the year 2000. Following this, Odamtten became a member of the University Council of the Pentecost University College from 2001 to 2014. Odamtten was appointed a member of the Ghana Education Service Council in 2002 and served as a member until 2008. In between service on the GES Council, Odamtten became a member of the University Council of the University of Education, Winneba from 2004 to 2008. In 2005, Odamtten was a member of the review panel for science education for science programmes at the University of Botswana and the WHO Expert Committee Group on Aflatoxins in Foods, Republic of the Congo. He also served as a member of the National Codex Alimentarius Commission Committee on Food Additives and Security from 2006. He serves on the expert committee for the annual review of programme of the Cocoa Research Institute of Ghana, CRIG.

Awards and honours
He was a one time member of the New York Academy of Sciences (1997). Odamtten was listed in the Dictionary of International Biography Vol.27,(1998) for distinguished service and cited in the Marquis Who's Who in the World (1998, 2000). He has also served as an Advisor for the International Foundation for Sciences (IFS) 2000.

Personal life
George Tawia Odamtten married Catherine Neeney Wayoe in 1974. He has three daughters from this marriage. He is a Christian, a church council elder and a patron to Christian Groups in higher institutions in Ghana.

Selected publications 
 (contrib.) IFFIT Report No. 10 – Studies on the Technological Feasibility of the Application of Dry Or Moist Heat to Grains and Grain Products Prior to Gamma Irradiation: Short Communication, 1980;
 (contrib.) IFFIT Report No. 11 – in Vitro Studies on the Effect of the Combination Treatment of Heat and Irradiation on Spores of Aspergillus Flavus Link NRRL 5906, 1980;
 (contrib.) IFFIT Report No. 12 – Control of Moulds Causing Deterioration of Maize Grains in Storage by Combination Treatment: A Preliminary Model Study with Aspergillus Flavus Link NRRL 5906, 1980;
 (contrib.) IFFIT Report No. 13 – Production of Aflatoxin B1 by Aspergillus Flavus Link in Submerged Static Culture After Combination Treatment of Heat and Gamma Irradiation, 1980;
 (contrib.) IFFIT Report No 15 – Production of Aflatoxin B1 During Storage of Maize Grains Subjected to the Combination Treatment of Heat and Gamma Irradiation, 1980;
 (contrib.) IFFIT Report No. 16 – Preliminary Studies on the Effect of the Combination Treatment of Heat and Gamma Irradiation on the Keeping Quality of Animal Feed and Cotton Seeds, 1980;
 Studies on the Possibilities of Using a Combination of Moist Heat and Radiation to Control Mouldiness in Dried Cocoa Beans, 1980;
 Fungi, Man's Allies Or Enemies?, 1988.
Odamtten, G. T.; Clerk, G. C. (1988) "Effect of metabolites of Aspergillus niger and Trichoderma viride on development and structure of radicle of cocoa (Theobroma cacao) seedlings" Plant and Soil, 106 (2): 285–288

References

1948 births
20th-century Ghanaian botanists
21st-century Ghanaian botanists
Living people
People from Accra
Alumni of the Accra Academy
Ga-Adangbe people
Ghanaian Presbyterians
University of Ghana alumni
Academic staff of the University of Ghana
Osu Salem School alumni
Ghanaian mycologists
Odamtten family
Fellows of the Ghana Academy of Arts and Sciences